James Rowbottom (born 19 September 2000) is a professional Australian rules footballer who plays for the Sydney Swans in the Australian Football League (AFL). He was recruited by the Sydney Swans with the 25th draft pick in the 2018 AFL Draft.

Early life
Rowbottom participated in the Auskick program at Glenferrie in Hawthorn, Victoria. he played his junior football St Kevin's College, Melbourne and the Oakleigh Chargers in the TAC Cup. He was recruited by the Sydney Swans in 2018 AFL draft at Pick No. 25.

Statistics
Updated to the end of the 2022 season.

|-
| 2019 ||  || 8
| 12 || 4 || 5 || 90 || 74 || 164 || 32 || 59 || 0.3 || 0.4 || 7.5 || 6.2 || 13.7 || 2.7 || 4.9
|-
| 2020 ||  || 8
| 16 || 4 || 4 || 132 || 105 || 237 || 22 || 58 || 0.3 || 0.3 || 8.3 || 6.6 || 14.8 || 1.4 || 3.6
|-
| 2021 ||  || 8
| 17 || 6 || 3 || 152 || 110 || 262 || 35 || 105 || 0.4 || 0.2 || 8.9 || 6.5 || 15.4 || 2.1 || 6.2
|-
| 2022 ||  || 8
| 24 || 8 || 7 || 279 || 164 || 443 || 60 || 163 || 0.3 || 0.3 || 11.6 || 6.8 || 18.5 || 2.5 || 6.8
|- class=sortbottom
! colspan=3 | Career
! 69 !! 22 !! 19 !! 653 !! 453 !! 1106 !! 149 !! 385 !! 0.3 !! 0.3 !! 9.5 !! 6.6 !! 16.0 !! 2.2 !! 5.6
|}

Personal life

References

External links

2000 births
Living people
Sydney Swans players
Australian rules footballers from Victoria (Australia)
People educated at St Kevin's College, Melbourne
Oakleigh Chargers players